La Perche is a commune in the Cher department in the Centre-Val de Loire region of France.

Geography
The commune borders on the department of Allier.

Population

Sights
 The church of St. Jean, dating from the thirteenth century.

See also
Communes of the Cher department
 Le Perche (ancient region in Normandy)

References

Communes of Cher (department)